Elkhart County is a county located in the U.S. state of Indiana. , the county's population was 207,047. The county seat is Goshen. Elkhart County is part of the Elkhart-Goshen Metropolitan Statistical Area, which in turn is part of the South Bend-Elkhart-Mishawaka Combined Statistical Area. The area is referred to by locals as the recreation vehicle (RV) capital of the world and is known for its sizable Amish and Old Order Mennonite population.

History
At the beginning of the nineteenth century, the area now within Elkhart County boundaries was mainly inhabited by the Potawatomi tribe. Pioneers began settling in the Elkhart Prairie in 1829 and in April 1830, Elkhart County was officially established with its original county seat in Dunlap. After reorganizing the county borders, the seat was moved to Goshen near the county's geographical center.

Elkhart County was founded by immigrants from New England. These were old-stock "Yankee" immigrants, descended from the English Puritans who settled New England in the 1600s. The completion of the Erie Canal in 1821 sparked a surge in immigration from New England to northern Indiana, which had become a state five years earlier. The end of the Black Hawk War in 1832 increased the immigration surge of immigration, again coming from New England as a result of overpopulation combined with land shortages in that region. Some of these later settlers were from upstate New York, whose relatives had moved to that region from New England shortly after the American Revolutionary War. New Englanders and New England transplants from upstate New York were the vast majority of Elkhart County's inhabitants during the first several decades of its history. These settlers were primarily members of the Congregational Church though due to the Second Great Awakening many of them had converted to Methodism and some had become Baptists before moving west. The Congregational Church subsequently has gone through many divisions, and some factions, including those in Elkhart County, are now known as the Church of Christ and the United Church of Christ. As a result of this heritage, most of Elkhart County supported the abolitionist movement before the American Civil War. Elkhart County provided substantial recruits for the Union Army. During the end of the nineteenth century, Irish and German migrants came to Elkhart County, although most did not come directly from Europe, but had stopped in other areas in the Midwest, such as Ohio.

Name
The origin of "Elkhart" is not known. Three theories have been proposed: a) the area was named after a native tribe (although no historical evidence has surfaced to prove the existence of such a tribe); b) the Island Park in Elkhart City has the shape of an elk's heart. Although this theory is carried on the city's website, simple logic throws shade on this possibility. c) The county was named after the Shawnee Indian chief Elkhart, cousin of the famous Chief Tecumseh, and father of princess Mishawaka (for whom neighboring Mishawaka is named).

Geography

The county sits in mostly rural farmland with rolling hills in its northeast corner. Those hills were formed by glaciers and are part of the St. Lawrence Seaway Continental Divide.

The St. Joseph River, which flows from Michigan, across the Michigan border north of Bristol, is the main waterway in Elkhart County. The Elkhart River enters the county east of Millersburg and winds its way through Goshen and Dunlap to Island Park in Elkhart where it meets the St. Joseph. The Little Elkhart River flows into the county southeast of Middlebury and creates some scenic views in Bonneyville Mills County Park before emptying into the St. Joseph near Bristol. Numerous creeks wind their way through the countryside and several lakes, including Simonton Lake, dot the landscape.

Fifteen unincorporated communities also exist in the county. They are Benton, Bonneyville Mills, Dunlap, Foraker, Garden Village, Jimtown, Locke, Midway, New Paris, Nibbyville, Simonton Lake, Southwest, Vistula, and Waterford Mills.

Townships

Adjacent counties
 Cass County, Michigan (northwest)
 St. Joseph County, Michigan  (northeast)
 LaGrange County  (east)
 Noble County  (southeast)
 Kosciusko County  (south)
 Marshall County (southwest)
 St. Joseph County (west)

Communities

Cities
 Elkhart
 Goshen
 Nappanee

Towns
 Bristol
 Middlebury
 Millersburg
 Wakarusa

Census-designated places
 Dunlap
 New Paris
 Simonton Lake

Other unincorporated communities

 Benton
 Bonneyville Mills
 Foraker
 Jimtown
 Locke
 Midway
 New Paris
 Southwest
 Vistula
 Waterford Mills

Economy
Elkhart County is known as "The RV Capital of the World" because of its substantial recreational vehicle-based economy. Farming also plays a big role in the local economy. Tourism boosts the county's economy. Destinations such as Das Dutchman Essenhaus in Middlebury and Amish Acres in Nappanee along with annual events such as the Elkhart Jazz Festival, the Amish Acres Arts & Crafts Festival, and the Elkhart County 4-H Fair draw thousands of tourists annually. The Fair is the second largest county fair in the United States.

Climate and weather

Government
The county is led by a board of three elected commissioners that serve as the executive branch of county government. The board also serves as the legislative branch in that it is responsible for ordinances. The county council is made of seven elected members - one from each of the four council districts and three at large. The council is in charge of all monetary issues including appropriations and taxes. There are Township Assessors for Baugo, Cleveland, Concord, Elkhart, Middlebury, and Osolo townships and a County Assessor to handle the remaining townships.

Elkhart County is part of Indiana's 2nd congressional district; Indiana Senate districts 9, 11, and 12; and Indiana House of Representatives districts 21, 22, 48, 49, and 82.
 
Elkhart County has consistently been a Republican Party stronghold in presidential elections. In only three elections since 1888 has a Republican candidate failed to win the county, most recently in 1964.

Demographics

As of the 2010 United States Census, there were 197,559 people, 70,244 households, and 50,542 families residing in the county. The racial makeup of the county was 82.9% white, 5.7% black or African American, 1.0% Asian, 0.4% American Indian, 7.5% from other races, and 2.5% from two or more races. Those of Hispanic or Latino origin made up 14.1% of the population. In terms of ancestry, 28.4% were German, 10.2% were Irish, 7.6% were English, and 7.6% were American.

Of the 70,244 households, 38.1% had children under 18 living with them, 53.9% were married couples living together, 12.6% had a female householder with no husband present, 28.0% were non-families, and 22.7% of all households were made up of individuals. The average household size was 2.76, and the average family size was 3.23. The median age was 34.9 years.

The median income for a household in the county was $47,697, and the median income for a family was $53,742. Males had a median income of $41,891 versus $29,496 for females. The per capita income for the county was $22,187. About 10.2% of families and 13.7% of the population were below the poverty line, including 21.5% of those under age 18 and 8.5% of those age 65 or over.

2020 census

Transportation

Roads
The Indiana Toll Road (Interstates 80/90) runs through the northern fringes of the county. Elkhart has two interchanges (exits 92 & 96) while Bristol (exit 101) and Middlebury (exit 107) have one apiece. U.S. Route 20 skirts the southern edges of Elkhart as the St. Joseph Valley Parkway until the freeway ends at the County Road 17 interchange. U.S. 20 continues eastward as a regular surface highway. County Road 17 is known as the "Michiana Parkway" and provides a connection between Goshen, U.S. 20, S.R. 120, the Elkhart East interchange (Exit 96) on the Toll Road, and US 12 in Michigan via M-217.

U.S. Highways 6, 33, and 131 also run through the county along with Indiana State Highways 4, 13, 15, 19, 119, and 120. U.S. 33 was once part of the original Lincoln Highway.

Other forms
A bus system known as the Interurban Trolley serves several municipalities throughout Elkhart County, connecting Elkhart and Goshen, as well as Osceola, Dunlap and Mishawaka, using buses that look like trolley cars. These buses are manufactured at government expense in RV facilities of Elkhart County. The county's only Amtrak and Greyhound bus stations are in Elkhart.

Elkhart, Nappanee, and Goshen all have municipal airports. Amtrak makes four daily stops in Elkhart.

Education
The county has seven public school districts, seven private schools, and one college. Several other colleges have satellite campuses in the city of Elkhart.

Public schools
The Elkhart Community Schools, the largest district, serves the populated northwest side of the county. The system includes fourteen elementary schools (Beardsley, Bristol, Cleveland, Eastwood, Hawthorne, Mary Beck, Mary Daly, Mary Feeser, Monger, Osolo, Pinewood, Riverview, Roosevelt STEAM Academy, and Woodland), three middle schools (North Side, Pierre Moran, and West Side), two high schools (Central and Memorial), which in 2020 will merge into a singular Elkhart High School, one alternative school (Tipton Street Center), and the Elkhart Area Career Center.

The Middlebury Community Schools serve the northeast side of the county. This system includes four elementary schools (Jefferson, Middlebury, Orchard View, and York), one intermediate school (Heritage), one middle school, and one high school both named Northridge.

The Fairfield Community Schools serve the county's southeast corner. This system includes three elementary schools (Benton, Millersburg, and New Paris) and a junior-senior high school named Fairfield.

The Wa-Nee Community Schools serve the southwest portion of the county. This system consists of three elementary schools (Nappanee, Wakarusa, and Woodview), a middle school, and a high school both named NorthWood.

The Baugo Community Schools serve the west-central part of the county. This system is made up of an elementary, an intermediate, a junior high, and a high school each named Jimtown.

The Concord Community Schools serve the southeast side of the city of Elkhart and northwest Goshen. This system consists of four elementary schools (East Side, Ox Bow, South Side, and West Side), an intermediate school, a junior high school, and a high school; all named Concord.

Finally, the Goshen Community Schools serve the central part of Elkhart County. This system is made up of seven elementary schools (Chamberlain, Chandler, Model, Parkside, Prairieview, Waterford, and West Goshen), a middle and a high school all named Goshen.

Private schools
In addition to the public schools, there are nine private schools in the county. Kessington Christian School (grades PK-12) is in Bristol;  Elkhart Christian Academy (grades K-12), Trinity Lutheran School (grades K-8), St. Vincent de Paul Catholic School (grades PK-8), and St. Thomas the Apostle School (grades K-8) are in Elkhart; while Bethany Christian (grades 4–12), Bashor Alternative School (grades 4–10), St. John the Evangelist Catholic School (grades PK-6), and Clinton Christian School (grades K-12) are in Goshen.

Higher education
Elkhart County has six institutions for higher learning, two of which are solely located in the county: Goshen College, a small Mennonite liberal arts college of 1000 students in Goshen; and the Anabaptist Mennonite Biblical Seminary, which has been operating on Elkhart's south side since 1958.

The city of Elkhart has four satellite campuses within its city limits. Bethel College of Mishawaka has a small satellite campus on the south side, Indiana Institute of Technology has a small operation on Middlebury Street, Indiana University South Bend has its "Elkhart Center" downtown, and Ivy Tech Community College has a campus as well.

Recreation

County parks and lands

The park offers hiking trails, fishing spots, shelters, and guided tours of Bonneyville Mill. The mill is still used to produce flour.

Ox Bow Park sits on  overlooking the Elkhart River midway between Elkhart and Goshen. The park offers hiking trails, shelters, disc golf, and an archery range.

River Preserve Park is  located between Benton and the Goshen Dam also on the Elkhart River. The park also offers several trails and shelters and provides insight into the history of Indiana's waterways.

Treasure Island Park offers fishing and canoe access to the St. Joseph River west of Elkhart while the Turkey Creek (two miles south of Goshen) and Wolf Lake (two miles north of Goshen) sites have no public access but are described as "future parks."

The cities and towns of Elkhart County also have numerous parks and greenways.

Museums
 Bonneyville Mill, in the park of the same name east of Bristol, shows the inner workings of a grain mill.
 Bristol is home to the Elkhart County Historical Museum.
 The Jimtown Historic Museum depicts life in the 19th century.
 The Midwest Museum of American Art is in Elkhart and has over 2500 works in its collection.
 The National New York Central Railroad Museum in Elkhart tells the history of the New York Central, Penn Central, Amtrak and Conrail railroads.
 The RV/MH Hall of Fame & Museum is on the northeast side of Elkhart.
 Ruthmere is a grand 1910 Beaux Arts mansion with significant fine arts and decorative arts collections, an arts reference library, vintage automobiles, gardens, and a greenhouse. Collections include works of art by Rodin, Camille Claudel, Louis Comfort Tiffany, Samuel Morse, Jane Stuart, and other important European and American artists of the 19th and early 20th century.
 "Time Was", a small historical museum that interprets life in late 19th and early 20th century Elkhart and includes collections of print material, photographs, objects, and general memorabilia.

Sports team
Elkhart's North Side Gymnasium was home to the Elkhart Express International Basketball League team. However, after (2) winning seasons, the Express ceased to exist in 2009.

Annual events

 Bristol holds an annual Homecoming Festival during the first week of July and nearby Bonneyville Mill Park hosts a harvest celebration every September.
 Elkhart hosts the Elkhart Jazz Festival and the Rhapsody in Green Summer celebration. Both take place in June.
 Goshen plays host to First Fridays events on the first weekend of every month throughout the year. Thousands visit downtown Goshen each year to attend the varied festivals which take place each month.
 Middlebury holds a Summer Festival every August.
 Nappanee and Amish Acres host the Amish Acres Arts & Crafts Festival at the end of July.
 Wakarusa hosts an annual Maple Syrup Festival every April.

All of these events draw in many people every year, but the biggest event, by far, in the county is the Elkhart County 4-H Fair. This nine-day event is one of the largest county fairs in the United States.

Media
The Elkhart Truth and The Goshen News are the two daily newspapers that serve the county while Bristol, Middlebury, and Nappanee all have weekly newspapers.

Elkhart County lies in the South Bend-Elkhart television market, the 89th largest in the United States . One television station, WSJV-TV (Fox), is located in Elkhart along with several radio stations including WTRC, WLEG, WFRN and WVPE (NPR). Radio Stations WKAM and Goshen College's WGCS are located in Goshen.

Notable media mentions

 On Palm Sunday 1965, a flurry of severe weather moved through the county. After three tornadoes (one was a twin tornado), 66 people had died in Elkhart County. 137 would die on this day statewide.
 In 1999, officer Thomas Goodwin became Goshen's first, and to date, only police officer killed in the line of duty, at a shooting in the northwest part of town.
 The Accra-Pac Factory in Elkhart had two explosions from 1970 to 1997.
 On December 6, 2001, Goshen was featured on national and international news networks due to a shooting at the Nu-Wood factory. While initial reports said that 35 people had been shot, the toll was much less: the gunman killed one co-worker, wounded six others, and then killed himself.
 Much of "Devil's Playground," an Amish coming-of-age documentary by director Lucy Walker, was filmed in Elkhart County. The film's central character, Faron Yoder, is kin to Elkhart County Vice President and District 2 Commissioner Mike Yoder, as well as District 3 Councilman Clarence J. Yoder.
 On February 9, 2009 U.S. President Barack Obama held a town hall meeting at Concord High School in Elkhart to discuss the economic downturn and promote his economic stimulus package. He chose Elkhart because it had one of the highest unemployment rates in the nation.

Notable people
 Edward Bonney (1807-1863), detective, bounty hunter, and city planner of the defunct town of Bonneyville, present-day Bonneyville Mill County Park, in Bonneyville Mills
Frederick A. Herring, a Textile manufacturer, evangelist, dissident in Elberfeld (Rhineland) / physician and botanist in Goshen (1812-1908)

See also

 List of counties in Indiana
 List of counties in Michigan
 Michiana
 National Register of Historic Places listings in Elkhart County, Indiana
 List of public art in Elkhart County, Indiana

References

 
Indiana counties
1830 establishments in Indiana
Populated places established in 1830
South Bend – Mishawaka metropolitan area